Lincoln Township is a township in Bedford County, Pennsylvania, United States. The population was 386 at the 2020 census.

Geography
Lincoln Township is located in northwestern Bedford County.

Recreation
A portion of the Blue Knob State Park, a portion of the Gallitzin State Forest (Babcock Division) and a portion of the Pennsylvania State Game Lands Number 26 is located along the northwest border of township.

Demographics

As of the census of 2000, there were 380 people, 142 households, and 112 families residing in the township.  The population density was 23.4 people per square mile (9.0/km).  There were 177 housing units at an average density of 10.9/sq mi (4.2/km).  The racial makeup of the township was 98.42% White, 0.79% African American, and 0.79% from two or more races. Hispanic or Latino of any race were 1.58% of the population.

There were 142 households, out of which 32.4% had children under the age of 18 living with them, 71.8% were married couples living together, 4.2% had a female householder with no husband present, and 21.1% were non-families. 18.3% of all households were made up of individuals, and 7.0% had someone living alone who was 65 years of age or older.  The average household size was 2.68 and the average family size was 3.04.

In the township the population was spread out, with 24.5% under the age of 18, 7.6% from 18 to 24, 27.4% from 25 to 44, 21.1% from 45 to 64, and 19.5% who were 65 years of age or older.  The median age was 39 years. For every 100 females, there were 108.8 males.  For every 100 females age 18 and over, there were 108.0 males.

The median income for a household in the township was $25,962, and the median income for a family was $32,500. Males had a median income of $26,583 versus $16,875 for females. The per capita income for the township was $13,847.  About 8.7% of families and 13.0% of the population were below the poverty line, including 22.0% of those under age 18 and 15.3% of those age 65 or over.

References

Populated places established in 1794
Townships in Bedford County, Pennsylvania
Townships in Pennsylvania
1794 establishments in Pennsylvania